The men's 10 metre platform, also reported as platform diving, was one of four diving events on the Diving at the 1988 Summer Olympics programme.

The competition was split into two phases:

Preliminary round (26 September)
Divers performed ten dives. The twelve divers with the highest scores advanced to the final.
Final (27 September)
Divers performed another set of ten dives and the score here obtained determined the final ranking.

Days after suffering a concussion during a missed dive in winning the 3 metre springboard event, defending champion Greg Louganis won the fourth gold medal of his Olympic career, scoring a near-perfect 86.70 points on his final dive to win by a narrow margin of 1.14 points.

Results

References

Sources
 

Men
1988
Men's events at the 1988 Summer Olympics